Peter Schlütter (25 November 1893 – 6 April 1959) was a Danish sailor who competed in the 1928 Summer Olympics.

In 1928 he won the silver medal as crew member of the Danish boat Hi-Hi in the 6 metre class competition.

References

References 
 
 
 

1893 births
1959 deaths
Danish male sailors (sport)
Olympic sailors of Denmark
Sailors at the 1928 Summer Olympics – 6 Metre
Olympic silver medalists for Denmark
Olympic medalists in sailing

Medalists at the 1928 Summer Olympics